Giulia Zanderighi is an Italian-born theoretical physicist born in 1974. She is the first woman director at the Max Planck Institute for Physics.

Education 
Giulia Zanderighi received her undergraduate degree from the University of Milan in 1998 and her PhD in physics from the University of Pavia in 2001.

Career 
Zanderighi held postdoctoral positions at Durham University from 2001 to 2003, Fermilab from 2003 to 2005, and CERN from 2005 to 2007. In 2007, she became an assistant professor at the University of Oxford, and in 2014 she became a professor there. In 2018, she was appointed director at the Max Planck Institute for Physics. She leads the department of novel computational techniques in particle phenomenology and is the first woman director at the institute in its more than 100-year history. She is an internationally recognized expert in collider phenomenology.

References

External links 
Giulia Zanderighi's page at the Max Planck Institute for Physics
Giulia Zanderighi's author page at INSPIRE-HEP

Italian physicists
University of Pavia alumni
Theoretical physicists
Particle physicists
Italian women physicists
Living people
1974 births
Max Planck Institute directors
University of Milan alumni